This is a list of Italian Ministers of Public Education since the birth of the Italian Republic in 1946. The list shows also the ministers that served under the same office but with other names, in fact this Ministry has changed name many times. The Minister of Public Education leads the Ministry of Education, Universities and Research.

The current minister is Giuseppe Valditara, a member of the League who is serving since 22 October 2022 in the government of Giorgia Meloni.

List of Public Education Ministers
Parties:
1946–1994:

1994–present

Coalitions:

Timeline

References

Minister of Education
Ministers of Education
Education